Peter Fagan may refer to:

Peter Fagan, American psychologist
Peter Fagan (politician), American politician, member of the Vermont House of Representatives
Peter Fagan, Canadian politician, see Candidates of the Queensland state election, 2006
Peter Fagan, American journalist, paramour of Helen Keller